Jean-Pierre Bel (born 30 December 1951) is a French retired politician who served as President of the Senate from 2011 to 2014. From the Ariège department, Bel is a member of the Socialist Party; he was elected to the Senate in September 1998 and re-elected in September 2008. Bel was President of the Socialist Group in the Senate from 2004 to 2011.

Following the September 2008 Senate election, Bel was the Socialist candidate for the post of President of the Senate on 1 October 2008, but because the right held a majority of seats in the Senate, he was defeated by Gérard Larcher. In the vote, he received 134 votes against 173 votes for Larcher.

The left won a Senate majority in the September 2011 Senate election, and Bel was elected as President of the Senate on 1 October 2011. He received 179 votes against 134 votes for the right's candidate, outgoing Senate President Larcher; a centrist, Valerie Letard, received 29 votes.

References

Page on the Senate website

|-

|-

|-

1951 births
Living people
People from Lavaur, Tarn
Socialist Party (France) politicians
French Senators of the Fifth Republic
Senators of Ariège (department)
Toulouse 1 University Capitole alumni
Presidents of the Senate (France)